Leslie Ferguson (8 September 1892 – 30 January 1957) was an Australian cricketer. He played four first-class cricket matches for Victoria between 1920 and 1924.

See also
 List of Victoria first-class cricketers

References

External links
 

1892 births
1957 deaths
Australian cricketers
Victoria cricketers
Cricketers from Melbourne